Turan G. Bali is an American economist, currently the Robert S. Parker Chair Professor of Business Administration at McDonough School of Business, Georgetown University, and previously the David Krell Chair Professor of Finance at Baruch College.

References

Year of birth missing (living people)
Living people
McDonough School of Business faculty
American economists
Baruch College faculty
City University of New York alumni